A bosque is a type of gallery forest habitat found along the riparian flood plains of stream and river banks in the southwestern United States.  It derives its name from the Spanish word for 'woodlands'.

Setting 
In the predominantly arid or semi-arid southwestern United States, a bosque is an oasis-like ribbon of green vegetation, often canopied, that only exists near rivers, streams, or other water courses.  The most notable bosque is the -long ecosystem along the valley of the middle Rio Grande in New Mexico that extends from Santa Fe south to El Paso, Texas. One of the most famous and ecologically intact sections of the bosque is included in the Bosque del Apache National Wildlife Refuge.

Flora and fauna 
Thanks to the resulting ecosystem from the river and the forest in the desert, Bosque has a characteristic variety of flora and fauna. Common trees in the bosque habitat include mesquite, cottonwood, desert willow, and desert olive. Because there is often only a single canopy layer and because the tree species found in the bosque are generally deciduous, a wide variety of shrubs, grasses, and other understory vegetation is also supported.  Desert hackberry, blue palo verde, graythorn (Condalia lycioides), Mexican elder (Sambucus mexicana), virgin's bower, and Indian root all flourish in the bosque. The habitat also supports a large variety of lichens.  For a semi-arid region, there is extraordinary biodiversity at the interface of the bosque and surrounding desert ecosystems. Certain subsets of vegetative association are defined within the Kuchler scheme, including the Mesquite Bosque. In 2017, 150 different species of flora (trees, shurbs, forbs, and grasses) were documented in Albuquerque's Bosque (New Mexico, United States).

The bosque is an important stopover for a variety of migratory birds, such as ducks, geese, egrets, herons, and Sandhill Cranes. Year-round avian residents include Red-tailed hawks, Cooper's hawks, American kestrels, hummingbirds, owls, woodpeckers, and the southwestern willow flycatcher. Over 270 species of birds can be found in Albuquerque's Bosque (New Mexico, United States). Aquatic fauna of the bosque include the endangered Rio Grande silvery minnow. Mammalian residents include desert cottontail, white-footed mouse, North American porcupine, American beaver, long-tailed weasel, common raccoon, coyote, mountain lions, and bobcats. Cottonwood trees serve as shelter to a variety of animals.

Restoration
There are ongoing efforts to undo damage to the bosque ecosystem caused by human development, fires, and invasive species in the 20th century. Where possible, levees and other flood control devices along the Rio Grande are being removed, to allow the river to undergo its natural cycle. Since 1996, the Bosque Ecosystem Monitoring Program (BEMP) of the University of New Mexico has worked on habitat restoration and ecological monitoring within the bosque, as well as raising awareness of the ecological importance of this habitat through educational outreach initiatives.

See also
Flora of New Mexico
Riparian forest
Tugay, an analogous forest type in the deserts and steppes of Central Asia

References

External links

 Save our Bosque Report (.pdf)
 Bosque Management and Endangered Species (BMEP)
 Fire commander: Bosque’s urban area presents challenge
 Race to reduce bosque fires

 
 
Forests of the United States
Habitats
Natural history of New Mexico
Riparian zone